Dylan McGeouch (born 15 January 1993) is a Scottish footballer, who currently plays as a midfielder for Forest Green Rovers. McGeouch, who has previously played for Celtic, Coventry City, Hibernian, Sunderland and Aberdeen, made his first full international appearance for Scotland in May 2018.

Early life
McGeouch grew up in the Milton area of Glasgow, supporting Celtic.

Club career

Celtic youth
McGeouch started his career with the Celtic youth system, frequently playing alongside Callum McGregor who was also a teammate in youth Victory Shield internationals at Under-16 level; at that time McGeouch was a pupil at Bishopbriggs Academy. He was often a ball boy for first team matches during his time there.

He left Celtic in 2008 after his older brother Darren, who was also playing for the club's youth teams, fell out of favour.

Rangers youth
McGeouch went to Rangers in 2008, but he returned to Celtic in 2011 after Neil Lennon visited his house and asked him to come back. Rangers manager Walter Smith had appealed to McGeouch to stay at Rangers. Rangers were later awarded £100,000 by a transfer tribunal regarding the McGeouch transfer.

Celtic
McGeouch made his Celtic debut on 6 November 2011, when he came on as a late substitute in a 2–1 win over Motherwell. On 26 November, he made his second appearance for Celtic, coming on as a 64th-minute substitute against St Mirren. Eight minutes later he scored his first goal for the club after collecting the ball deep inside his own half and running 70 yards, dribbling past several St Mirren players, before striking a low left foot shot into the net to seal a 5–0 victory.

Coventry City (loan)
On 30 January 2014, McGeouch was loaned to Coventry City for the remainder of the 2013–14 season. He returned to Celtic in the summer of 2014.

Hibernian
After making one appearance for Celtic in August 2014, he was loaned to Hibernian until the end of the season. He made his first appearance against Cowdenbeath on 13 September. He received a red card in the League Cup fixture against Ross County for a heavy tackle on Joe Cardle. He scored his first goal for Hibernian in a 4–0 victory over Livingston at Almondvale Stadium.

On 21 August 2015, McGeouch signed permanently for Hibernian on a three-year deal. He suffered a series of injury problems during the 2015–16 season and was restricted to 19 league appearances. McGeouch came back into the team for the promotion playoffs, in which Hibs lost 5–4 on aggregate to Falkirk. He then played the full game as Hibs defeated Rangers in the 2016 Scottish Cup Final, their first victory in the competition for 114 years.

McGeouch was restricted to 18 league appearances in 2016–17, as Hibs won promotion to the Scottish Premiership. He scored one goal during the season, the second Hibs goal in the 2016–17 Scottish Cup semi-final defeat by Aberdeen.

McGeouch produced impressive performances during the 2017–18 season, as he was able to stay relatively free of injury problems. He earned a selection for the international squad in March 2018, but then had to withdraw due to an abductor injury. With his contract due to expire at the end of the season, head coach Neil Lennon confirmed during May 2018 that McGeouch would leave under freedom of contract.

Sunderland
McGeouch signed for EFL League One club Sunderland in July 2018.

Aberdeen
On 7 January 2020, McGeouch signed for Scottish Premiership club Aberdeen on a permanent deal until 2022.

In August 2020 he was one of eight Aberdeen players who received a suspended three-match ban from the Scottish FA after they breached coronavirus-related restrictions by visiting a bar earlier in the month.

Forest Green Rovers
On 22 November 2022, McGeouch joined EFL League One club Forest Green Rovers on a deal until the end of the 2022–23 season.

International career
McGeouch was called up to the Scotland under-21 squad on 17 April 2012, to face Italy eight days later.

McGeouch was selected for the full Scotland squad in March 2018, but he had to withdraw due to injury. He was again selected for the squad in May 2018, for friendly matches in Peru and Mexico. McGeouch made his full Scotland debut on 29 May 2018, in a 2–0 defeat to Peru.

Career statistics

Style of play
McGeouch's primary position was as an attacking midfielder but used to also play on the wings. He has developed as a central midfield player during his time at Hibernian.

Honours

Club
Celtic
Scottish Premier League: 2011–12, 2012–13

Hibernian
Scottish Cup: 2015–16
Scottish Championship: 2016–17

Sunderland
EFL Trophy runner-up: 2018–19

Individual
Celtic Goal of the Season: 2011–12
Hibernian Player of the Year 2018
Hibernian Players’ Player of the Year 2018

References

External links

1993 births
Association football midfielders
Celtic F.C. players
Living people
Rangers F.C. players
Scotland under-21 international footballers
Scotland youth international footballers
Scottish footballers
Scottish Premier League players
Footballers from Glasgow
Coventry City F.C. players
English Football League players
Scottish Professional Football League players
Hibernian F.C. players
Scotland international footballers
Sunderland A.F.C. players
Aberdeen F.C. players
Forest Green Rovers F.C. players